The 2010–11 Montenegrin Cup was the fifth season of the Montenegrin knockout football tournament. The winner of the tournament received a berth in the second qualifying round of the 2011–12 UEFA Europa League. The defending champions were Rudar, who beat Budućnost in the final of the 2009–10 competition. The competition featured 30 teams. It started on 15 September 2010 and ended with the final on 25 May 2011.

First round
The 14 matches were played on 15 September 2010, with the exception of the match between Kom and Petrovac match, which was postponed until 22 September 2010.

Summary

|}

Matches

Bracket

Second round
The 14 winners from the First Round and last year's cup finalists, Rudar and Budućnost, compete in this round.  Starting with this round, all rounds of the competition will be two-legged except for the final.  The first legs were held on October 20, 2010, while the second legs were held on November 3, 2010.

Summary

|}

First legs

Second legs

Quarter-finals
The eight winners from the Second Round will compete in this round. The first legs took place on 24 November 2010 and the second legs took place on 8 December 2010.

Summary

|}

First legs

Second legs

Semi-finals
The four winners from the Quarter-finals will compete in this round. These matches took place on 13 and 27 April 2011.

Summary

|}

First legs

Second legs

Final
The two winners from the Semifinals competed in a single-legged final, held on 25 May 2011.

References

External links
Montenegrin Cup 2010-2011 (pages 57-62) at Football Association of Montenegro's official site
Montenegrin Cup 2010-2011 at Soccerway
Montenegrin Cup 2010-2011 at RSSSF

Montenegrin Cup seasons
Montenegrin Cup
Cup